Begnadalen Church is a parish church of the Church of Norway in Sør-Aurdal Municipality in Innlandet county, Norway. It is located in the village of Begnadalen. It is the church for the Begnadalen parish which is part of the Valdres prosti (deanery) in the Diocese of Hamar. The brown, wooden church was built in a long church design in 1964 using plans drawn up by the architects Arnstein Arneberg and Per Solemslie. The church seats about 240 people.

History
The first church in Begnadalen was constructed in 1859 using designs by the architect Christian Heinrich Grosch. The church was a wooden octagonal building. This church burned down in 1957 after receiving electric heating the year before. After the fire, planning soon began for building a new church. The new church was designed by Arnstein Arneberg and Per Solemslie. The lead builder was Ola Svendsen from Begnadalen. The building is a wooden long church with a rectangular nave and a smaller chancel on the east end. The nave and chancel have a stave church-inspired raised middle section. On the south side of the choir there is a wing with a sacristy, meeting rooms and side rooms. The new church was consecrated on 13 September 1964.

Media gallery

See also
List of churches in Hamar

References

Sør-Aurdal
Churches in Innlandet
Long churches in Norway
Wooden churches in Norway
20th-century Church of Norway church buildings
Churches completed in 1964
1859 establishments in Norway